Wyoming's state elections were held on November 8, 2016.

All 60 seats of the Wyoming Legislature and 15 seats (half) of the Wyoming Senate were up for election.

Federal Elections

Presidential Election

House at-large District

Wyoming Legislature

Summary
Senate

House of Representatives

State Senate

House of Representatives

Source: Wyoming Secretary of State, Ballotpedia

References

 
Wyoming